Vincentava (formerly) is a village in Kėdainiai district municipality, in Kaunas County, in central Lithuania. According to the 2011 census, the village had a population of 45 people. The Pernarava-Šaravai Forest is located nearby. The A1 highway goes next to Vincentava village.

History
At the end of the 19th century there were three Vincentavas: Vicentava and Būda Vincentava in Ariogala volost and one Vincentava in Vilkija volost. Later Vincentava manor and Vincentava okolica were mentioned. In 1925 Vincentava estate and folwarks were parcelated.

Demography

References

Villages in Kaunas County
Kėdainiai District Municipality